Devi Yunita Indah Sari (born 10 June 1997) is an Indonesian badminton player affiliated with Djarum badminton club. She was part of the Indonesia junior team that won a silver medal at the 2015 World Junior Championships.

Achievements

BWF International Challenge/Series 
Women's singles

  BWF International Challenge tournament
  BWF International Series tournament
  BWF Future Series tournament

Performance timeline

National team 
 Junior level

Individual competitions 
 Senior level

References

External links 
 

1997 births
Living people
People from Sidoarjo Regency
Sportspeople from East Java
Indonesian female badminton players
21st-century Indonesian women
20th-century Indonesian women